Scouting, also known as the Scout Movement, is a worldwide youth movement employing the Scout method, a program of informal education with an emphasis on practical outdoor activities, including camping, woodcraft, aquatics, hiking, backpacking, and sports. Another widely recognized movement characteristic is the Scout uniform, by intent hiding all differences of social standing in a country and encouraging equality, with neckerchief and campaign hat or comparable headwear. Distinctive uniform insignia include the fleur-de-lis and the trefoil, as well as merit badges and other patches.

In 1907, Robert Baden-Powell, a Lieutenant General in the British Army, held a Scouting encampment on Brownsea Island in England. Baden-Powell wrote Scouting for Boys (London, 1908), partly based on his earlier military books. The Scout Movement of both Boy Scouts and Girl Scouts was well established in the first decade of the twentieth century. Later, programs for younger children, such as Wolf Cubs (1916), now Cubs, and for older adolescents, such as Rovers (1918), were adopted by some Scout organizations. In 1910, Baden-Powell formed the Girl Guides, for girls in the United Kingdom which spread internationally as Girl Guides and includes age programs of (Brownie Guide, Girl Guide and Girl Scout, Ranger Guide).

In 2007, Scouting and Guiding together had over 38 million members in 216 countries. International umbrella organizations include:
World Organization of the Scout Movement (WOSM), for boys-only and co-educational organizations
World Association of Girl Guides and Girl Scouts (WAGGGS), primarily for girls-only organizations but also accepting co-educational organizations
World Organization of Independent Scouts
Order of World Scouts
International Union of Guides and Scouts of Europe
Confederation of European Scouts.

History

Origins

The trigger for the Scouting movement was the 1908 publication of Scouting for Boys written by Robert Baden-Powell. At Charterhouse, one of England's most famous public schools, Baden-Powell had an interest in the outdoors. Later, as a military officer, Baden-Powell was stationed in British India in the 1880s where he took an interest in military scouting and in 1884 he published Reconnaissance and Scouting.

In 1896, Baden-Powell was assigned to the Matabeleland region in Southern Rhodesia (now Zimbabwe) as Chief of Staff to Gen. Frederick Carrington during the Second Matabele War. In June 1896 he met here and began a lifelong friendship with Frederick Russell Burnham, the American-born Chief of Scouts for the British Army in Africa. This was a formative experience for Baden-Powell not only because he had the time of his life commanding reconnaissance missions into enemy territory, but because many of his later Boy Scout ideas originated here. During their joint scouting patrols into the Matobo Hills, Burnham augmented Baden-Powell's woodcraft skills, inspiring him and sowing seeds for both the programme and for the code of honour later published in Scouting for Boys. Practised by frontiersmen of the American Old West and indigenous peoples of the Americas, woodcraft was generally little known to the British Army but well known to the American scout Burnham. These skills eventually formed the basis of what is now called scoutcraft, the fundamentals of Scouting. Both men recognised that wars in Africa were changing markedly and the British Army needed to adapt; so during their joint scouting missions, Baden-Powell and Burnham discussed the concept of a broad training programme in woodcraft for young men, rich in exploration, tracking, fieldcraft, and self-reliance. During this time in the Matobo Hills Baden-Powell first started to wear his signature campaign hat like the one worn by Burnham, and acquired his kudu horn, the Ndebele war instrument he later used every morning at Brownsea Island to wake the first Boy Scouts and to call them together in training courses.

Three years later, in South Africa during the Second Boer War, Baden-Powell was besieged in the small town of Mafikeng (Mafeking) by a much larger Boer army. The Mafeking Cadet Corps was a group of youths that supported the troops by carrying messages, which freed the men for military duties and kept the boys occupied during the long siege. The Cadet Corps performed well, helping in the defence of the town (1899–1900), and were one of the many factors that inspired Baden-Powell to form the Scouting movement. Each member received a badge that illustrated a combined compass point and spearhead. The badge's logo was similar to the fleur-de-lis shaped arrowhead that Scouting later adopted as its international symbol. The siege of Mafeking was the first time since his own childhood that Baden-Powell, a regular serving soldier, had come into the same orbit as "civilians"—women and children—and discovered for himself the usefulness of well-trained boys.

In the United Kingdom, the public, through newspapers, followed Baden-Powell's struggle to hold Mafeking, and when the siege was broken he had become a national hero. This rise to fame fuelled the sales of the small instruction book he had written in 1899 about military scouting and wilderness survival, Aids to Scouting, that owed much to what he had learned from discussions with Burnham.

On his return to England, Baden-Powell noticed that boys showed considerable interest in Aids to Scouting, which was unexpectedly used by teachers and youth organizations as their first Scouting handbook. He was urged to rewrite this book for boys, especially during an inspection of the Boys' Brigade (of which he was vice president at the time), a large youth movement drilled with military precision. Baden-Powell thought this would not be attractive and suggested that the Boys' Brigade could grow much larger were Scouting to be used. He studied other schemes, parts of which he used for Scouting.

In July 1906 Ernest Thompson Seton sent Baden-Powell a copy of his 1902 book The Birchbark Roll of the Woodcraft Indians. Seton, a British-born Canadian-American living in the United States, met Baden-Powell in October 1906, and they shared ideas about youth training programs. In 1907 Baden-Powell wrote a draft called Boy Patrols. In the same year, to test his ideas, he gathered 21 boys of mixed social backgrounds (from boy's schools in the London area and a section of boys from the Poole, Parkstone, Hamworthy, Bournemouth, and Winton Boys' Brigade units) and held a week-long camp in August on Brownsea Island in Poole Harbour, Dorset. His organizational method, now known as the Patrol System and a key part of Scouting training, allowed the boys to organize themselves into small groups with an elected patrol leader.

In late 1907, Baden-Powell went on an extensive speaking tour arranged by his publisher, Arthur Pearson, to promote his forthcoming book, Scouting for Boys. He had not simply rewritten his Aids to Scouting; he omitted the military aspects and transferred the techniques (mainly survival skills) to non-military heroes: backwoodsmen, explorers (and later on, sailors and airmen). He also added innovative educational principles (the Scout method) by which he extended the attractive game to a personal mental education.

At the beginning of 1908, Baden-Powell published Scouting for Boys in six fortnightly parts, setting out activities and programmes which existing youth organisations could use. The reaction was phenomenal, and quite unexpected. In a very short time, Scout Patrols were created up and down the country, all following the principles of Baden-Powell's book. In 1909, the first Scout Rally was held at Crystal Palace in London, to which 11,000 Scouts came—and some girls dressed as Scouts and calling themselves "Girl Scouts". Baden-Powell retired from the Army and, in 1910, he formed The Boy Scouts Association, and later The Girl Guides. By the time of The Boy Scouts Association's first census in 1910, it had over 100,000 Scouts.

Scouting for Boys was published in England later in 1908 in book form. The book is now the fourth-bestselling title of all time, and was the basis for the later American version of the Boy Scout Handbook.

At the time, Baden-Powell intended that the scheme would be used by established organizations, in particular the Boys' Brigade, from the founder William A. Smith. However, because of the popularity of his person and the adventurous outdoor games he wrote about, boys spontaneously formed Scout patrols and flooded Baden-Powell with requests for assistance. He encouraged them, and the Scouting movement developed momentum. In 1910 Baden-Powell formed The Boy Scouts Association in the United Kingdom. As the movement grew, Sea Scouts, Air Scouts, and other specialized units were added to the program.

The original Scout Law

The scouts law is for boys, as follows;

A Scout's honour is to be trusted – This means the scout will try as best as he can to do what he promised, or what is asked of him
A Scout is loyal – to his king or queen, his leaders and his country.
A Scout's duty is to be useful, and to help others
A Scout is a friend to all, and a brother to every other Scout – Scouts help one another, regardless of the differences in status or social class.
A Scout is courteous – He is polite and helpful to all, especially women, children and the elderly. He does not take anything for being helpful.
A Scout is a friend to animals – He does not make them suffer or kill them without need to do so.
A Scout obeys orders – Even the ones he does not like.
A Scout smiles and whistles
A Scout is thrifty – he avoids unnecessary spending of money.
A Scout is clean in thought, word and deed (added later)

The promise of 1908

In his original book on boy scouting, General Baden-Powell introduced the Scout promise, as follows:

"Before he becomes a scout, a boy must take the scout's oath, thus:

'On my honour I promise that—
I will do my duty to God and the King.
I will do my best to help others, whatever it costs me.
I know the scout law, and will obey it.'
While taking this oath the scout will stand, holding his right hand raised level with his shoulder, palm to the front, thumb resting on the nail of the little finger and the other three fingers upright, pointing upwards:—

This is the scout's salute and secret sign."

Movement

The Boy Scout Movement swiftly established itself throughout the British Empire soon after the publication of Scouting for Boys. By 1908, Scouting was established in Gibraltar, Malta, Canada, Australia, New Zealand, Malaya (YMCA Experimental Troop in Penang) and South Africa. In 1909 Chile was the first country outside the British dominions to have a Scouting organization recognized by Baden-Powell. The first Scout rally, held in 1909 at the Crystal Palace in London, attracted 10,000 boys and a number of girls. By 1910, Argentina, Denmark, Finland, France, Germany, Greece, India, Mexico, the Netherlands, Norway, Russia, Sweden, and the United States had Boy Scouts.

The program initially focused on boys aged 11 to 18, but as the movement grew the need became apparent for leader training and programs for younger boys, older boys, and girls. The first Cub Scout and Rover Scout programs were in place by the late 1910s. They operated independently until they obtained official recognition from their home country's Scouting organization. In the United States, attempts at Cub programs began as early as 1911, but official recognition was not obtained until 1930.

Girls wanted to become part of the movement almost as soon as it began. Baden-Powell and his sister Agnes Baden-Powell introduced the Girl Guides in 1910, a parallel movement for girls, sometimes named Girl Scouts. Agnes Baden-Powell became the first president of the Girl Guides when it was formed in 1910, at the request of the girls who attended the Crystal Palace Rally. In 1914, she started Rosebuds—later renamed Brownies—for younger girls. She stepped down as president of the Girl Guides in 1920 in favor of Robert's wife Olave Baden-Powell, who was named Chief Guide (for England) in 1918 and World Chief Guide in 1930. At that time, girls were expected to remain separate from boys because of societal standards, though co-educational youth groups did exist. By the 1990s, two-thirds of the Scout organizations belonging to WOSM had become co-educational.

Baden-Powell could not single-handedly advise all groups who requested his assistance. Early Scoutmaster training camps were held in London and Yorkshire in 1910 and 1911. Baden-Powell wanted the training to be as practical as possible to encourage other adults to take leadership roles, so the Wood Badge course was developed to recognize adult leadership training. The development of the training was delayed by World War I, and the first Wood Badge course was not held until 1919. Wood Badge is used by Boy Scout associations and combined Boy Scout and Girl Guide associations in many countries. Gilwell Park near London was purchased in 1919 on behalf of The Scout Association as an adult training site and Scouting campsite. Baden-Powell wrote a book, Aids to Scoutmastership, to help Scouting Leaders, and wrote other handbooks for the use of the new Scouting sections, such as Cub Scouts and Girl Guides. One of these was Rovering to Success, written for Rover Scouts in 1922. A wide range of leader training exists in 2007, from basic to program-specific, including the Wood Badge training.

Influences

Important elements of traditional Scouting have their origins in Baden-Powell's experiences in education and military training. He was a 50-year-old retired army general when he founded Scouting, and his revolutionary ideas inspired thousands of young people, from all parts of society, to get involved in activities that most had never contemplated. Comparable organizations in the English-speaking world are the Boys' Brigade and the non-militaristic Woodcraft Folk; however, they never matched the development and growth of Scouting.

Aspects of Scouting practice have been criticized as too militaristic. 

Local influences have also been a strong part of Scouting. By adopting and modifying local ideologies, Scouting has been able to find acceptance in a wide variety of cultures. In the United States, Scouting uses images drawn from the U.S. frontier experience. This includes not only its selection of animal badges for Cub Scouts, but the underlying assumption that American native peoples are more closely connected with nature and therefore have special wilderness survival skills which can be used as part of the training program. By contrast, British Scouting makes use of imagery drawn from the Indian subcontinent, because that region was a significant focus in the early years of Scouting. Baden-Powell's personal experiences in India led him to adopt Rudyard Kipling's The Jungle Book as a major influence for the Cub Scouts; for example, the name used for the Cub Scout leader, Akela (whose name was also appropriated for the Webelos), is that of the leader of the wolf pack in the book.

The name "Scouting" seems to have been inspired by the important and romantic role played by military scouts performing reconnaissance in the wars of the time. In fact, Baden-Powell wrote his original military training book, Aids To Scouting, because he saw the need for the improved training of British military-enlisted scouts, particularly in initiative, self-reliance, and observational skills. The book's popularity with young boys surprised him. As he adapted the book as Scouting for Boys, it seems natural that the movement adopted the names Scouting and Boy Scouts.

"Duty to God" is a principle of Scouting, though it is applied differently in various countries. The Boy Scouts of America (BSA) take a strong position, excluding atheists. The Scout Association in the United Kingdom permits variations to its Promise, in order to accommodate different religious obligations. While for example in the predominantly atheist Czech Republic the Scout oath doesn't mention God altogether with the organization being strictly irreligious, in 2014, United Kingdom Scouts were given the choice of being able to make a variation of the Promise that replaced "duty to God" with "uphold our Scout values", Scouts Canada defines Duty to God broadly in terms of "adherence to spiritual principles" and leaves it to the individual member or leader whether they can follow a Scout Promise that includes Duty to God. Worldwide, roughly one in three Scouts are Muslim.

Movement characteristics
Scouting is taught using the Scout method, which incorporates an informal educational system that emphasizes practical activities in the outdoors. Programs exist for Scouts ranging in age from 6 to 25 (though age limits vary slightly by country), and program specifics target Scouts in a manner appropriate to their age.

Scout method

The Scout method is the principal method by which the Scouting organizations, boy and girl, operate their units. WOSM describes Scouting as "a voluntary nonpolitical educational movement for young people open to all without distinction of origin, race or creed, in accordance with the purpose, principles and method conceived by the Founder". It is the goal of Scouting "to contribute to the development of young people in achieving their full physical, intellectual, social and spiritual potentials as individuals, as responsible citizens and as members of their local, national and international communities."

The principles of Scouting describe a code of behavior for all members, and characterize the movement. The Scout method is a progressive system designed to achieve these goals, comprising seven elements: law and promise, learning by doing, team system, symbolic framework, personal progression, nature, and adult support. While community service is a major element of both the WOSM and WAGGGS programs, WAGGGS includes it as an extra element of the Scout method: service in the community.

The Scout Law and Promise embody the joint values of the Scouting movement worldwide, and bind all Scouting associations together. The emphasis on "learning by doing" provides experiences and hands-on orientation as a practical method of learning and building self-confidence. Small groups build unity, camaraderie, and a close-knit fraternal atmosphere. These experiences, along with an emphasis on trustworthiness and personal honor, help to develop responsibility, character, self-reliance, self-confidence, reliability, and readiness; which eventually lead to collaboration and leadership. A program with a variety of progressive and attractive activities expands a Scout's horizon and bonds the Scout even more to the group. Activities and games provide an enjoyable way to develop skills such as dexterity. In an outdoor setting, they also provide contact with the natural environment.

Since the birth of Scouting, Scouts worldwide have taken a Scout Promise to live up to ideals of the movement, and subscribe to the Scout Law. The form of the promise and laws have varied slightly by country and over time, but must fulfil the requirements of the WOSM to qualify a National Scout Association for membership.

The Scout Motto, 'Be Prepared', has been used in various languages by millions of Scouts since 1907. Less well-known is the Scout Slogan, 'Do a good turn daily'.

Activities

Common ways to implement the Scout method include having Scouts spending time together in small groups with shared experiences, rituals, and activities, and emphasizing 'good citizenship' and decision-making by young people in an age-appropriate manner. Weekly meetings often take place in local centres known as Scout dens. Cultivating a love and appreciation of the outdoors and outdoor activities is a key element. Primary activities include camping, woodcraft, aquatics, hiking, backpacking, and sports.

Camping is most often arranged at the unit level, such as one Scout troop, but there are periodic camps (known in the US as "camporees") and "jamborees". Camps occur a few times a year and may involve several groups from a local area or region camping together for a weekend. The events usually have a theme, such as pioneering. World Scout Moots are gatherings, originally for Rover Scouts, but mainly focused on Scout Leaders. Jamborees are large national or international events held every four years, during which thousands of Scouts camp together for one or two weeks. Activities at these events will include games, Scoutcraft competitions, badge, pin or patch trading, aquatics, woodcarving, archery and activities related to the theme of the event.

In some countries a highlight of the year for Scouts is spending at least a week in the summer engaging in an outdoor activity. This can be a camping, hiking, sailing, or other trip with the unit, or a summer camp with broader participation (at the council, state, or provincial level). Scouts attending a summer camp work on Scout badges, advancement, and perfecting Scoutcraft skills. Summer camps can operate specialty programs for older Scouts, such as sailing, backpacking, canoeing and whitewater, caving, and fishing.

At an international level Scouting perceives one of its roles as the promotion of international harmony and peace. Various initiatives are in train towards achieving this aim including the development of activities that benefit the wider community, challenge prejudice and encourage tolerance of diversity. Such programs include co-operation with non-Scouting organisations including various NGOs, the United Nations and religious institutions as set out in The Marrakech Charter.

Uniforms and distinctive insignia

The Scout uniform is a widely recognized characteristic of Scouting. In the words of Baden-Powell at the 1937 World Jamboree, it "hides all differences of social standing in a country and makes for equality; but, more important still, it covers differences of country and race and creed, and makes all feel that they are members with one another of the one great brotherhood". The original uniform, still widely recognized, consisted of a khaki button-up shirt, shorts, and a broad-brimmed campaign hat. Baden-Powell also wore shorts, because he believed that being dressed like a Scout helped to reduce the age-imposed distance between adult and youth. Uniform shirts are now frequently blue, orange, red or green and shorts are frequently replaced by long trousers all year or only under cold weather.

While designed for smartness and equality, the Scout uniform is also practical. Shirts traditionally have thick seams to make them ideal for use in makeshift stretchers—Scouts were trained to use them in this way with their staves, a traditional but deprecated item. The leather straps and toggles of the campaign hats or Leaders' Wood Badges could be used as emergency tourniquets, or anywhere that string was needed in a hurry. Neckerchiefs were chosen as they could easily be used as a sling or triangular bandage by a Scout in need. Scouts were encouraged to use their garters for shock cord where necessary.

Distinctive insignia for all are Scout uniforms, recognized and worn the world over, include the Wood Badge and the World Membership Badge. Scouting has two internationally known symbols: the trefoil is used by members of the World Association of Girl Guides and Girl Scouts (WAGGGS) and the fleur-de-lis by member organizations of the WOSM and most other Scouting organizations.

The swastika was used as an early symbol by the Boy Scouts Association of the United Kingdom and others. Its earliest use in Scouting was on the Thanks Badge introduced in 1911. Lord Baden-Powell's 1922 design for the Medal of Merit added a swastika to the Scout Arrowhead to symbolize good luck for the recipient. In 1934, Scouters requested a change to the design because of the connection of the swastika with its more recent use by the German National Socialist Workers (Nazi) Party. A new Medal of Merit was issued by the Boy Scouts Association in 1935.

Age groups and sections

Scouting and Guiding movements are generally divided into sections by age or school grade, allowing activities to be tailored to the maturity of the group's members. These age divisions have varied over time as they adapt to the local culture and environment.

Scouting was originally developed for adolescents—youths between the ages of 11 and 17. In most member organizations, this age group composes the Scout or Guide section. Programs were developed to meet the needs of young children (generally ages 6 to 10) and young adults (originally 18 and older, and later up to 25). Scouts and Guides were later split into "junior" and "senior" sections in many member organizations, and some organizations dropped the young adults' section. The exact age ranges for programs vary by country and association.

The national programs for younger children include Tiger Cubs, Cub Scouts, Brownies, Daisies, Rainbow Guides, Beaver Scouts, Joey Scouts, Keas, and Teddies. Programs for post-adolescents and young adults include the Senior Section, Rover Scouts, Senior Scouts, Venture Scouts, Explorer Scouts, and the Scout Network. Many organizations also have a program for members with special needs. This is usually known as Extension Scouting, but sometimes has other names, such as Scoutlink. The Scout Method has been adapted to specific programs such as Air Scouts, Sea Scouts, Rider Guides and Scoutingbands .

In many countries, Scouting is organized into neighborhood Scout Groups, or Districts, which contain one or more sections. Under the umbrella of the Scout Group, sections are divided according to age, each having their own terminology and leadership structure.

Adults and leadership

Adults interested in Scouting or Guiding, including former Scouts and Guides, often join organizations such as the International Scout and Guide Fellowship. In the United States and the Philippines, university students might join the co-ed service fraternity Alpha Phi Omega. In the United Kingdom, university students might join the Student Scout and Guide Organisation, and after graduation, the Scout and Guide Graduate Association. In some countries, it's possible to join scouting and guiding organizations as a show of support without accepting an active volunteering position, one option being joining a group specifically for adults, such as ScoutLink or a Trefoil Guild.

Scout units are usually operated by adult volunteers, such as parents and carers, former Scouts, students, and community leaders, including teachers and religious leaders. Scout Leadership positions are often divided into 'uniform' and 'lay' positions. Uniformed leaders have received formal training, such as the Wood Badge, and have received a warrant for a rank within the organization. Lay members commonly hold part-time roles such as meeting helpers, committee members and advisors, though there are a small number of full-time lay professionals.

A unit has uniformed positions—such as the Scoutmaster and assistants—whose titles vary among countries. In some countries, units are supported by lay members, who range from acting as meeting helpers to being members of the unit's committee. In some Scout associations, the committee members may also wear uniforms and be registered Scout leaders.

Above the unit are further uniformed positions, called Commissioners, at levels such as district, county, council or province, depending on the structure of the national organization. Commissioners work with lay teams and professionals. Training teams and related functions are often formed at these levels. In the UK and in other countries, the national Scout organization appoints the Chief Scout, the most senior uniformed member.

Around the world

Following its foundation in the United Kingdom, Scouting spread around the globe. The first association outside the British Empire was founded in Chile on May 21, 1909, after a visit by Baden Powell. In most countries of the world, there is now at least one Scouting (or Guiding) organization. Each is independent, but international cooperation continues to be seen as part of the Scout Movement. In 1922 the WOSM started as the governing body on policy for the national Scouting organizations (then male only). In addition to being the governing policy body, it organizes the World Scout Jamboree every four years.

In 1928 the WAGGGS started as the equivalent to WOSM for the then female-only national Scouting/Guiding organizations. It is also responsible for its four international centres: Our Cabaña in Mexico, Our Chalet in Switzerland, Pax Lodge in the United Kingdom, and Sangam in India.

Today at the international level, the two largest umbrella organizations are:
 World Organization of the Scout Movement (WOSM), for boys-only and co-educational organizations.
 World Association of Girl Guides and Girl Scouts (WAGGGS), primarily for girls-only organizations but also accepting co-educational organizations.

Co-educational

There have been different approaches to co-educational Scouting. Some countries have maintained separate Scouting organizations for boys and girls, In other countries, especially within Europe, Scouting and Guiding have merged, and there is a single organization for boys and girls, which is a member of both the WOSM and the WAGGGS. The United States-based Boy Scouts of America permitted girls to join in early 2018. In others, such as Australia and the United Kingdom, the national Scout association has opted to admit both boys and girls, but is only a member of the WOSM, while the national Guide association has remained as a separate movement and member of the WAGGGS. In some countries like Greece, Slovenia and Spain there are separate associations of Scouts (members of WOSM) and guides (members of WAGGGS), both admitting boys and girls.

The Scout Association in the United Kingdom has been co-educational at all levels since 1991, and this was optional for groups until the year 2000 when new sections were required to accept girls. The Scout Association transitioned all Scout groups and sections across the UK to become co-educational by January 2007, the year of Scouting's centenary. The traditional Baden-Powell Scouts' Association has been co-educational since its formation in 1970.

In the United States, the Cub Scout and Boy Scout programs of the BSA were for boys only until 2018; it has changed its policies and is now inviting girls to join, as local packs organize all-girl dens (same uniform, same book, same activities). For youths age 14 and older, Venturing has been co-educational since the 1930s. The Girl Scouts of the USA (GSUSA) is an independent organization for girls and young women only. Adult leadership positions in the BSA and GSUSA are open to both men and women.

In 2006, of the 155 WOSM member National Scout Organizations (representing 155 countries), 122 belonged only to WOSM, and 34 belonged to both WOSM and WAGGGS. Of the 122 which belonged only to WOSM, 95 were open to boys and girls in some or all program sections, and 20 were only for boys. All 34 that belonged to both WOSM and WAGGGS were open to boys and girls.

WAGGGS had 144 Member Organizations in 2007 and 110 of them belonged only to WAGGGS. Of these 110, 17 were coeducational and 93 admitted only girls.

Membership

Nonaligned and Scout-like organizations

Fifteen years passed between the first publication of Scouting for Boys and the creation of the current largest supranational Scout organization, WOSM, and millions of copies had been sold in dozens of languages. By that point, Scouting was the purview of the world's youth, and several Scout associations had already formed in many countries.

Alternative groups have formed since the original formation of the Scouting "Boy Patrols". They can be a result of groups or individuals who maintain that the WOSM and WAGGGS are more political and less youth-based than envisioned by Lord Baden-Powell. They believe that Scouting in general has moved away from its original intent because of political machinations that happen to longstanding organizations, and want to return to the earliest, simplest methods. Others do not want to follow all the original ideals of Scouting but still desire to participate in Scout-like activities.

In 2008, there were at least 539 independent Scouting organizations around the world, 367 of them were a member of either WAGGGS or WOSM. About half of the remaining 172 Scouting organizations are only local or national oriented. About 90 national or regional Scouting associations have created their own international Scouting organizations. Those are served by five international Scouting organizations:
 Order of World Scouts – the first international Scouting organisation, founded in 1911.
 International Union of Guides and Scouts of Europe, an independent faith-based Scouting organization founded in 1956.
 Confederation of European Scouts, established in 1978.
 World Federation of Independent Scouts, formed in Laubach, Germany, in 1996.
 World Organization of Independent Scouts, mostly South-American, founded in 2010.

Some Scout-like organizations are also served by international organizations, many with religious elements, for example:
 Pathfinders – A youth organization of the Seventh-day Adventist Church, formed in 1950.
 Royal Rangers – A youth organization of the Assemblies of God, formed in 1962.

Influence on society
After the inception of Scouting in the early 1900s, some nations' programs have taken part in social movements such as the nationalist resistance movements in India. Although Scouting was introduced to Africa by British officials as a way to strengthen their rule, the values they based Scouting on helped to challenge the legitimacy of British imperialism. Likewise, African Scouts used the Scout Law's principle that a Scout is a brother to all other Scouts to collectively claim full imperial citizenship.

A study has found a strong link between participating in Scouting and Guiding as a young person, and having significantly better mental health. The data, from almost 10,000 individuals, came from a lifelong UK-wide study of people born in November 1958, known as the National Child Development Study.

Controversies

In the United Kingdom, The Scout Association had been criticised for its insistence on the use of a religious promise, leading the organization to introduce an alternative in January 2014 for those not wanting to mention a god in their promise. This change made the organisation entirely non-discriminatory on the grounds of race, gender, sexuality, and religion (or lack thereof).

The Boy Scouts of America was the focus of criticism in the United States for not allowing the open participation of homosexuals until removing the prohibition in 2013.

Communist states such as the Soviet Union in 1920 and fascist regimes like Nazi Germany in 1934 often either absorbed the Scout movement into government-controlled organizations, or banned Scouting entirely.

In film and the arts

Scouting has been a facet of culture during most of the twentieth century in many countries; numerous films and artwork focus on the subject. Movie critic Roger Ebert mentioned the scene in which the young Boy Scout, Indiana Jones, discovers the Cross of Coronado in the movie Indiana Jones and the Last Crusade, as "when he discovers his life mission".

The works of painters Ernest Stafford Carlos, Norman Rockwell, Pierre Joubert and Joseph Csatari and the 1966 film Follow Me, Boys! are prime examples of this ethos. Scouting is often dealt with in a humorous manner, as in the 1989 film Troop Beverly Hills, the 2005 film Down and Derby, and the film Scout Camp . In 1980, Scottish singer and songwriter Gerry Rafferty recorded I was a Boy Scout as part of his Snakes and Ladders album.

See also

 Camp Fire Girls
 Kibbo Kift
 Order of Woodcraft Chivalry
 Pioneer movement
 SpiralScouts International

References

Further reading
 László Nagy, 250 Million Scouts, The World Scout Foundation and Dartnell Publishers, 1985
 World Organization of the Scout Movement, Scouting 'round the World. Facts and Figures on the World Scout Movement. 1990 edition. 
 
 World Association of Girl Guides and Girl Scouts, World Bureau, Trefoil Round the World. 11th ed. 1997.

External links

 Milestones in World Scouting
 World Scouting infopage by Troop 97
 The World Scout Emblem by Pinetree Web
 Scoutwiki – international wiki for Scouting
 The Scouting Pages – All sorts of Scouting Facts
 

 
Organizations established in 1907
1907 establishments in the United Kingdom